Stoney Branch is a  long 3rd order tributary to Tyndall Branch, in Sussex County, Delaware.

Variant names
According to the Geographic Names Information System, it has also been known historically as:  
Tyndall Branch

Course
Stoney Branch rises on the Sheep Pen Ditch divide about 1 mile southeast of Whaleys Crossroads in Sussex County, Delaware.  Stoney Branch then flows southwest to meet Tyndall Branch about 0.5 miles north of Hardscrabble.

Watershed
Stoney Branch drains  of area, receives about 45.1 in/year of precipitation, has a topographic wetness index of 722.14 and is about 14.03% forested.

See also
List of rivers of Delaware

References

Rivers of Delaware
Tributaries of the Nanticoke River